Events from the year 1934 in Romania. The year saw the country sign the Balkan Pact.

Incumbents
 King: Carol II. 
 Prime Minister:
Constantin Angelescu (interim, until 4 January).
Gheorghe Tătărescu (from 5 January).

Events
 9 February – Romania signs the Balkan Pact with Greece, Turkey and Yugoslavia in Athens.
 27 May – The national football team is defeated by Czechoslovakia in the first round of the 1934 FIFA World Cup.
 20 August – The Union of Hungarian Workers of Romania (MADOSZ,  or ) is founded.
 26 September – Ford Romania buy the land on which they will build their factory in Bucharest.
 October – The Criterion Association is dissolved, Mircea Vulcănescu citing the rise of fascism for the demise.
 22 November – Mihai Stelescu founds the newspaper Cruciada Românismului to propagate the Crusade of Romanianism.

Births
 22 February – Iuliana Simon, skier that competed in the 1956 Winter Olympics.
 29 April – Zoe Țapu, agronomist (died 2013).
 6 May – Stela Perin, artistic gymnast that competed in the 1952 Summer Olympics.
 21 September – Maria Scheip, handballer, gold medallist at the 1956, 1960, and 1962 World Championships.
 15 November – Kira Muratova, Romanian-born Soviet film director and screenwriter (died 2018).
 10 December – Leopoldina Bălănuță, actor (died 1998).

Deaths
 14 January – Ioan Cantacuzino, physician, bacteriologist, and a titular member of the Romanian Academy (born 1863).
 16 February – Ștefan Cicio Pop, politician (born 1865).
 20 April – Constanța Hodoș, novelist, playwright and journalist (born 1860).
 24 September – Alexandru Mavrodi, director of the National Theatre Bucharest (born 1881).

References

Years of the 20th century in Romania
1930s in Romania
 
Romania
Romania